Andreas Vasilogiannis (born 21 February 1991) is a Greek professional footballer who plays as a right midfielder for Super League 2 club Kalamata. 

He has represented his country at youth level and has played in the qualifying and elite rounds of the UEFA Under-17 European Championship.

Career

Early career
Born in Patras, Greece, Vasilogiannis started his career at local club Dyni Achaia, from where he was transferred to the youth academies of Olympiacos in May 2007. He made his official debut with the first team at the 2007 Greek Super Cup, coming as a substitute for Leonel Núñez in the 77th minute.

Loan spells

Ethnikos Piraeus
In August 2010, Vasilogiannis moved to Football League side Ethnikos Piraeus on a season-long loan. He made 22 appearances in the 2010–11 Football League, scoring 3 goals.

Apollon Limassol and Glyfada
On 31 August 2011, Vasilogiannis was loaned out to Cypriot First Division side Apollon Limassol for a year. However, he never featured in the plans of his manager, Mihai Stoichiță, and he was released in late December of the same year, having failed to make a single first team appearance for the club.

In January 2012, just a few weeks after his return to Olympiacos, Football League 2 side Glyfada offered to sign him on loan until the end of the season, an offer which Olympiacos accepted as the player would not get any playing time there.

Kerkyra
On 5 July 2012, Vasilogiannis moved to Kerkyra FC in the Superleague for a one-year loan. He made his Superleague debut on 16 September 2012, in a home match against Skoda Xanthi.

Chania and Lamia
On 29 August 2013, he released his contract with Olympiakos joining the newly promoted Football League club Chania. On 9 July 2014, after a successful year (33 appearances, 2 goals, 5 assists) in Football League, he joined Lamia in a year contract for an undisclosed fee.

Ermis Aradippou
On 8 July 2015, Vasilogiannis agreed to continue his career with Cypriot First Division club Ermis Aradippou, following his former coach, Pavlos Dermitzakis. He signed a year contract (plus one more) for an undisclosed fee.

Second spell in Lamia
On 16 June 2016, Vasilogiannis returned to his former club Lamia in order to help with his experience to fulfill the club's goal to be promoted to Super League. It was announced as the MVP of the season.

Ümraniyespor
On 4 July 2017, Vasilogiannis signed a three years contract with TFF First League club Ümraniyespor for an annual €180,000 fee. On 18 September 2017, he scored his first goal with the club in a 1–1 away draw against Eskişehirspor.

Third spell in Lamia
Vasilogiannis returned to Lamia in August 2019, signing a two-year contract.

References

External links

Myplayer.gr Profile
Profile at Guardian.co.uk

1991 births
Living people
Greek footballers
Association football midfielders
Olympiacos F.C. players
Ethnikos Piraeus F.C. players
Apollon Limassol FC players
Expatriate footballers in Cyprus
Super League Greece players
A.O. Kerkyra players
Ümraniyespor footballers
PAS Lamia 1964 players
Greek expatriate sportspeople in Turkey
Footballers from Patras